Eno  Ebenso  is a Nigerian Professor of Physical Chemistry (born 18 November 1964) in the Okobo local government area of Akwa Ibom State, Nigeria who rose from the rank  of Assistant lecturer to a Professor in the Department of Physical Chemistry, University of Calabar in 2009.  Eno Ebenso eventually got appointment with the Department of Chemistry, North West University (Mafikeng Campus), South Africa and currently with the Institute of Nanotechnology and Water Sustainability, CSET, University of South Africa. He is a known authority on  chemistry of corrosion and  has published extensively in the area of corrosion inhibition chemistry with an n H-Index of 40 and over 5406 total citations from the Scopus Search Engine of Elsevier Science since 1996 according to the Elsevier SciVal Insights Report (2010-2015). He has a citation impact of 10% above the world average; he is the second most prolific author in the field of corrosion inhibition world wide and has the fifth most downloads of his publications globally in the field of corrosion inhibition with Google Scholar Citations of over 6000 since 2011 with an H index of 51 and i10-index of 139.

Education 
Prof Eno Ebenso obtained his PhD in Physical Chemistry from the University of Calabar, Nigeria (2004); MSc in Physical Chemistry from the University of Ibadan, Nigeria (1990) and BSc Honours in Chemistry from the University of Calabar, Nigeria in 1986.

References 

Nigerian chemists

1964 births

Living people